According to the Book of Mormon, Antiparah was located south of the city of Judea, and at a higher elevation than Zarahemla.

The Lamanites, led by their king Ammoron, a Zoramite by birth, took Antiparah and three other cities, Manti, Zeezrom, and Cumeni. Antiparah seems to be the farthest west of the group, being the one closest to the city in the borders of the west seashore.

References
The Book of Mormon: Another Testament of Jesus Christ, translated by Joseph Smith, Jr. (Salt Lake City, Utah: The Church of Jesus Christ of Latter-day Saints, 1981 [first edition, 1830]).

Book of Mormon places